The Golden Bridge is a 19th-century pedestrian bridge located in the  in the borough Stadtmitte of Düsseldorf, Germany. The heritage-listed structure is the city's oldest pedestrian bridge.

During the War of the First Coalition, Düsseldorf was occupied by French troops during 1795. The area of the old Hofgarten was occupied by the troops and fortifications built. In 1804, the landscape architect Maximilian Friedrich Weyhe developed a new layout for the area. This saw the Nördliche Düssel, which flows through the Hofgarten, being dammed forming two lakes. In 1809, the narrowing at the boundary of the two lakes was connected by an arched pedestrian bridge. In 1820, the handrails of this original bridge were painted with gold-bronze which gave the bridge its name.

In 1845, the original bridge was replaced with the current bridge, a flat-decked structure to a design by the architect Anton Schnitzler. The steel substructure is partially painted in gold in keeping with its name. The current handrail was installed in 1951. The Golden Bridge was last renovated in 2015. When work started, it was realised that a more complex renovation was needed than had been anticipated, which delayed the reopening to pedestrian and bicycle traffic until June 2016.

References

Monuments and memorials in North Rhine-Westphalia
Bridges completed in 1845
Buildings and structures in Düsseldorf
Urban planning in Germany
Pedestrian bridges in Germany
Bridges in North Rhine-Westphalia